The Scituate Reservoir is the largest inland body of water in the state of Rhode Island. It and its six tributary reservoirs—which make up a total surface area of —supply drinking water to more than 60 percent of the state population, including Providence.

The Scituate Reservoir is operated by Providence Water Supply Board.

Water supply system
An aqueduct from the dam carries water to a nearby treatment plant, which filters the water. Two major aqueducts carry the water from the plant into the distribution system.

History

Providence's original public water supply came from the Pawtuxet River at Pettaconsett in Cranston. The plan was approved in 1869 and the first service pipe opened on December 1, 1871. By 1910, with Providence's heavy industry growing and the supply system being expanded to surrounding communities, people realized that the flow from Pettaconsett would soon fall short of the rising demands. For some years, extremely dry weather caused water consumption to exceed the natural flow of the river, and water had to be supplied by small reservoirs owned by mill companies further upstream.

In January 1913, the Providence City Council appointed a Water Supply Board to locate a larger water supply for the city. They found a potential source at the head of the North Branch Pawtuxet River and its two main tributaries, the Moswansicut and Ponaganset Rivers. A new Water Supply Board was appointed in 1915 with powers to enact the legislation that cleared the way for construction of the reservoir.

Construction was well under way by 1921. At that time, it was the largest project ever undertaken in Rhode Island, and workers were housed in a temporary village established nearby. The reservoir was created by the construction of an earth-filled dam across the Pawtuxet River near the former village of Kent. The reservoir began storing water on November 10, 1925. The treatment plant began operation on September 30, 1926. At the official opening ceremonies that day, Providence Mayor Joseph H. Gainer called the $21,000,000 project the "City's Greatest" and said ".. the man to whom most of the credit for this undertaking belongs is Frank E. Winsor, the man who has been in charge of the work since 1915." The dam is known today as the Gainer Memorial Dam in honor of the mayor.

The plant was one of the most technologically advanced of its day and the only one of its kind in New England. It was renovated in the 1940s and again in the 1960s.

The issue of pollution of the reservoir was the primary reason for the cancellation of I-84 between Hartford and Providence in 1982.

On February 21, 1982, Pilgrim Airlines Flight 458 crash-landed on the frozen reservoir due to an in-flight fire.

Consequences
The creation of the reservoir flooded much of the town of Scituate, including the villages of Ashland, Kent, South Scituate, Richmond, and the western part of North Scituate. Other parts of town were destroyed as Providence acquired land surrounding the reservoir. In total, Providence acquired  of land. Most residents of this area were forced to move out of Scituate and received compensation from the city for the property they lost. Some individuals such as businessman and farmer Arthur Steere sold hundreds of acres for the creation of the Reservoir.

Between 1920 and 1930, the town's population decreased by 24 percent to 2,292, the lowest number since the 1780s. 1,195 buildings were demolished, which included 375 homes, 233 barns, 7 schools, and 6 mills. The loss of 30 dairy farms limited agricultural activity in town.

Most people complied as they were forced to settle elsewhere, but some families were unwilling to part with the houses they had inhabited for generations. The Joslin family, which owned large mills in the doomed villages, fought a long legal battle, which they eventually lost. After moving out, the family built an opulent rural estate on Field Hill. The Knight family, while selling their property, set fire to their house as they were reluctant to leave. A few residents even committed suicide.

See also
Moswansicut River
Ponaganset River
North Branch Pawtuxet River

References

Camarda, Nicole, Clean Water for Rhode Island: The Story of the Scituate Reservoir, in Rhode Island Roads, accessed 8-17-2006
Nimiroski, Mark T. and Waldron, Marcus C., Sources of Sodium and Chloride in the Scituate Reservoir Drainage Basin, Rhode Island, USGS, accessed 8-17-2006
Providence Water Supply Board, History of Providence Water and the Scituate Reservoir, accessed 8-17-2006
Rhode Island Historical Preservation & Heritage Commission, The Scituate Reservoir, North Scituate Public Library, accessed 8-17-2006
Smith, Robert L., Scituate Reservoir: A story of sacrifice, in The Providence Journal, accessed 8-17-2006

External links
 75th Anniversary Page on Providence Water Website
 List of Landowners who sold land for the Reservoir's Creation

Lakes of Providence County, Rhode Island
Reservoirs in Rhode Island
Scituate, Rhode Island
Buildings and structures in Providence County, Rhode Island
Protected areas of Providence County, Rhode Island
Dams in Rhode Island
United States local public utility dams